The Argyll Hotel is a hotel located on Argyll Street in Dunoon, Argyll and Bute, Scotland. It is a Category B listed building built in the mid-19th century.

The building's tower, at the southern end of the building, was added in 1876. There has been an extension on its northern side, and a two-storey addition on the eastern side, connected to the main block by a curved wing.

The hotel has 33 bedrooms and two restaurants.

Gallery

References

External links
Argyll Hotel at SGE Hotel Group
A 19th-century photograph of the hotel

Hotels in Dunoon
Category B listed buildings in Argyll and Bute
Listed hotels in Scotland
Listed buildings in Dunoon